William John Baxter (29 May 1919 – 23 March 1983) was a former Australian rules footballer who played with Melbourne in the Victorian Football League (VFL).

Family
The son of William John Thomas Baxter (1892-1963), and Margaret Josephine Baxter (1888-1972), née Nihill, William John Baxter was born in Werribee, Victoria on 29 May 1919.

His brothers, Kenneth Matthew Patrick Baxter (1917-1959), and Bernard Patrick Baxter (1929-2012), both played with Carlton in the VFL.

He married Olive Lillian Sneezewell (1919-1983) on 23 November 1940.

Military service
He served in the Australian Army with the 32nd Battalion.

Death
He died at Werribee, Victoria on 23 March 1983.

Notes

References
 
 [https://nominal-rolls.dva.gov.au/veteran?id=630603&c=WW2 World War Two Nominal Roll: Private William John Baxter (V60336), Department of Veterans' Affairs.]
 A13860, V60336: World War Two Service Record: Private William John Baxter (V60336), National Archives of Australia.
 B884, V60336: World War Two Service Record: Private William John Baxter (V60336), National Archives of Australia.

 External links 

 
 
 Bill Baxter at Demonwiki''.

1919 births
Australian rules footballers from Melbourne
Melbourne Football Club players
1983 deaths
People from Werribee, Victoria
Australian Army personnel of World War II
Military personnel from Melbourne